State Route 339 (SR 339) is a north–south state highway in southeastern Ohio, a U.S. state.

Route description

SR 339's routing takes it through portions of the counties of Washington, Morgan and Noble.  No portion of SR 339 is included within the National Highway System, a network of highways deemed most important for the economy, mobility and defense of the nation.

History
SR 339 was established in 1933.  It was initially a spur route that ran along its present alignment from its northern terminus at SR 821, at the time a part of US 21, southwesterly to approximately its southern intersection with County Road 75 (CR 75) in southern Noble County.  This would only be temporary, as in 1935 the highway was extended southwesterly to a new southern terminus at its eastern junction with SR 60, then designated as SR 77, in Beverly.

In 1972, as a result of the designation of Interstate 76 (I-76) to Ohio, the SR 76 designation was eliminated.  The route northwest of Beverly was given the designation of SR 83, while the portion south of Beverly became an extension of SR 339, which now ended at its present southern terminus at SR 618 near Belpre.

Major intersections

References

339
Transportation in Washington County, Ohio
Transportation in Noble County, Ohio
Transportation in Morgan County, Ohio